Van Eeghen is the name of a Dutch patrician family from Kortemark in Belgium.

In the 17th century moved from Flanders to Middelburg and Haarlem. Later some members founded a successful trading company in Amsterdam.

From 1795 until 1818, the family owned Kasteel Beek en Hoff.

Notable members

 Isabella Henriette van Eeghen (1913-1996), Dutch historian
 Esmée van Eeghen (1918-1944), Dutch resistance fighter in World War II
 Hester van Eeghen (1958-2021), Dutch designer
 Mark van Eeghen (born 1952), American football player

Bibliography

Nederland’s Patriciaat, 2e jaargang (1911).
Nederland’s Patriciaat, 10e jaargang.(1919).
'Nederland’s Patriciaat, 45e jaargang''.(1959).

Dutch patrician families